The One I Love is a 2014 American comedy thriller film directed by Charlie McDowell and written by Justin Lader, starring Mark Duplass and Elisabeth Moss. The film had its world premiere at the Sundance Film Festival on January 21, 2014. It was released on August 1, 2014, through video on demand, prior to a limited release on August 22, 2014, by RADiUS-TWC.

Plot

Married couple Ethan and Sophie see a therapist regularly. After asking them to each play a note on a piano, he identifies a disconnection in their relationship and suggests they take a weekend on a secluded estate.

Once at the estate, Sophie goes to the guest cottage and has sex with Ethan. She returns to the house to find Ethan asleep. When she mentions the sex, he says he cannot remember, so Sophie, annoyed, goes to bed alone and he sleeps in the guest cottage. During the night, Sophie joins him, apologizing for her behavior and falling asleep next to him. The next morning, she makes him eggs and bacon, which is odd, as she notedly hates it.

Ethan returns to the main house where Sophie has no memory of joining him in the guest cottage. He deduces that something unusual is going on: In the guest cottage, they each met a doppelgänger of the other, convincing enough to pass. By visiting with Sophie II, Ethan establishes the doppelgängers do not leave the guest cottage. By barging in on Sophie's session with Ethan II, he determines that the doppelgängers disappear when both spouses are in the guest cottage and the doubles are idealized versions of them. Ethan and Sophie take advantage of the circumstances, and set rules, including a rule of "no intimacy".

Ethan figures an explanation for what's going on as some of his clothing is missing, and he receives voice mails from friends and family, answering calls, made in his voice, asking about his past. Sophie starts developing feelings for Ethan II and goes to the guest cottage to seduce him. Ethan discovers this by claiming to leave, but instead enters the guest house and assumes the place of his doppelgänger. Sophie seduces the real Ethan, unbeknownst to her.

The next morning, Sophie seeks refuge with Ethan II, and Ethan I disturbs them by entering the guest cottage. As they argue, they find Sophie II and Ethan II awaiting them in the main house. The four spend the evening together, where it becomes clear that Ethan II and Sophie II know they are playing a role. Ethan II also reveals Ethan I's duplicity at the guest cottage, at which point Sophie I asks Ethan I to leave. He goes to the guest cottage and finds a computer with files for different couples that include recordings of voices, and finds one with "Ethan & Sophie" learning to imitate him and Sophie I.

Ethan I finds he is trapped in the guest house, but Sophie II lets him out. She explains that she and Ethan II must cause the visiting couple to fall out of love. Then the residing couple leave, with the visiting couple trapped within the estate. However, Ethan II has fallen in love with Sophie I and is planning to leave with her. Sophie II does not want her husband to leave with another woman. Ethan I explains this to Sophie I, but Ethan II catches the other revealing the plan.

Ethan II attempts to convince Sophie I to flee with him. When she refuses, he runs away on his own but hits an invisible barrier and collapses unconscious. Each Sophie has an opposing reaction, one distressed for Ethan II and the other smiling at Ethan I. Ethan I grabs the smiling Sophie and they leave.

Ethan and Sophie drive to the therapist's office, finding it abandoned so they head home. One morning, Ethan asks Sophie what she plans on making for breakfast. Calling back from downstairs, she replies eggs and bacon; Ethan takes a long moment to ponder this before joining her.

Cast
 Mark Duplass as Ethan 
 Elisabeth Moss as Sophie 
 Ted Danson as therapist
 Mary Steenburgen as Mom (voice)
 Charlie McDowell as Madison (voice)
 Mel Eslyn as Victoria (voice)

Production
In March 2013, it was revealed that Elisabeth Moss, Mark Duplass, and Ted Danson had been cast in the film, with Mel Eslyn producing and Duplass executive producing. Mary Steenburgen provided the voice of Duplass's character's mother. Rooney Mara, McDowell's girlfriend (at the time), served as the costume designer, but received credit as Bree Daniel.

Filming
Principal photography lasted 15 days, at Mary Steenburgen and Ted Danson's house in Ojai, California.

Release
The film had its world premiere at the 2014 Sundance Film Festival on January 21, 2014. Shortly after, RADiUS-TWC acquired worldwide distribution rights to the film. The film went onto screen at the Tribeca Film Festival on April 25, 2014. That same month, RADiUS set the film for an August 15, 2014 release. It was released through video on demand on August 1, 2014, prior to a limited release on August 22, 2014.

Home media
The film was released to Blu-Ray and DVD by Anchor Bay Entertainment on November 4, 2014. It was then released on Netflix on November 29, 2014, and has since been made available to stream on Netflix.

Reception

Box office
The One I Love opened in a limited release in the United States in 8 theaters and grossed $48,059 with an average of $6,007 per theater and ranking number 42 at the box office. The film's widest release was 82 theaters and it ended up earning $513,447 domestically and $69,817 internationally for a total of $583,264. The film made an additional $500,000 through video on demand sales.

Critical response
The One I Love received mostly positive reviews from critics and has a "certified fresh" score of 82% on review aggregator Rotten Tomatoes based on 94 reviews with an average rating of 7.00/10. The critical consensus states, "The One I Love doesn't take its intriguing premise quite as far as it could, but it still adds up to an ambitious, well-acted look at love and marriage." The film also has a score of 65 out of 100 on Metacritic based on 27 critics, indicating "generally favorable reviews."

Manohla Dargis of The New York Times praised Moss's performance writing, "In The One I Love, she creates a complex portrait of a woman tested by love whose smiles work like a barricade until fissures of feeling break down her last defenses."

Geoffrey Berkshire of Variety wrote that "Charlie McDowell makes an incredibly assured directorial debut with this smart crowd-pleaser, featuring spectacular performances from Mark Duplass and Elisabeth Moss." Kate Erbland of Film.com praised the film, calling it a "tightly constructed and cleverly designed take on the modern love story." Cory Everett of IndieWire graded the film B, stating, "It's a very small-scale, unassuming relationship movie (with a heady little twist), but it sneaks up on you."

However, Todd McCarthy of The Hollywood Reporter criticized the film, commenting, "On a moment-to-moment basis, this smoothly made film can be incredibly trying, even annoying, to watch, due to the grueling repetitiveness of the scenes and dialogue and the claustrophobia of the paradoxically beautiful setting."

References

External links
 
 
 The AFI Interview: The One I Love's Charlie McDowell and Justin Lader
 

2014 films
2014 directorial debut films
2014 independent films
2014 romantic comedy-drama films
2014 thriller drama films
2010s comedy thriller films
2010s romantic thriller films
American comedy thriller films
American independent films
American romantic comedy-drama films
American romantic thriller films
American thriller drama films
Duplass Brothers Productions films
Films about couples
Films about vacationing
Films shot in California
2010s English-language films
2010s American films